

In philately, Leniniana is a topic for collecting postage stamps that tell about the life and story of Vladimir Lenin (1870–1924) or people, places, etc. connected with him.  The topic was common in the Soviet Union.

On the stamps of the USSR, Lenin was most frequently portrayed among the Bolsheviks. After 1923, his pictures were present on about 11% of all Soviet stamps. Lenin portrait first appeared on a stamp series that was the  printed immediately after his death in 1924. Images of the first Soviet leader soon became ubiquitous.

Because of various Lenin representations on postage stamps, it is hardly possible to categorise them all. Among different ways and roles in which Lenin was shown, there were:
 his simple portraits,
 Lenin as a child and youth,
 Lenin as the organiser of the Communist Party of the Soviet Union,
 Lenin as the founder of the first socialist state,
 Lenin as the organiser of the Party press,
 Lenin as an inspirer of Soviet organisations and activities, etc.

There was even a stamp depicting Vladimir Lenin near a New Year's tree celebrating the holiday with children.

See also

References

Further reading 
 Stal'baum, B. (1970). "Lenin, deti, filateliia" [Lenin, children, philately] (in Russian). Sovetskii Kollektsioner, 8: 6–9.

External links 
 
 Leniniana – philatelic collection
 Lenin: USSR (Soviet Union) Postage Stamps 1924–1991
 Leniniana Collection – Ryerson University Archives Special Collections 

Philately of the Soviet Union
Cultural depictions of Vladimir Lenin
Postage stamps depicting people
1924 introductions